The 1990 Albany Firebirds season was the first season for the Firebirds. They finished 3–5.

Regular season

Schedule

Standings

y – clinched regular-season title

x – clinched playoff spot

Roster

Awards

External links
1990 Albany Firebirds on ArenaFan.com

Albany Firebirds Season, 1990
Albany Firebirds
Indiana Firebirds seasons